The roads that join the towns of ,  and  form a triangle that encloses some of the most fertile land on the Darling Downs in Queensland, Australia. These roads are the Warrego Highway, Oakey–Cooyar Road and Dalby–Cooyar Road. Several of the more significant internal roads intersect with Dalby–Cooyar Road, and these are briefly described in this article, along with some significant external roads.

Dalby–Cooyar Road is a continuous  road route in the Western Downs and Toowoomba regions of Queensland. It is a regional road (number 416).

Route description
It leaves Dalby as Irvingdale Road and runs east, soon becoming Dalby–Cooyar Road. It turns north-east and reaches the eastern boundary of Dalby, where it passes the exit to Dalby–Nungil Road and turns north, passing between Dalby and  before turning north-east and running through  from south to east. In Kaimkillenbun village it passes the exit to Bell–Kaimkillenbun Road and turns east.

At the eastern boundary of Kaimkillenbun it passes the exit to Bunya Mountains Road and enters , which it runs through from west to east, passing the exit to Bowenville–Moola Road. In Maclagan village Bunya Mountains–Maclagan Road exits to the west and then turns north. Dalby–Cooyar Road continues north-east through Maclagan until it nears the eastern boundary, where it turns east and enters . The road ends at an intersection with Oakey–Cooyar Road (State Route 68) in Nutgrove.

Land use along this road is mainly crop farming.

This road is part of a network that enables access to the locality of Bunya Mountains from three lowland points, thus providing alternatives in case of flooding, other natural disasters, or planned maintenance.

Internal roads

Pechey–Maclagan Road

Pechey–Maclagan Road is a state-controlled district road (number 418), rated as a local road of regional significance (LRRS).

Bowenville–Moola Road

Dalby–Nungil Road
This road runs east from Dalby, intersecting with Bowenville–Moola Road and Pechey–Maclagan Road, thus providing a direct west-east link from Dalby to Rosalie Plains and beyond.

External roads

Bunya Mountains Road

Bunya Mountains Road is a state-controlled district road (number 4161), rated LRRS. It runs from Dalby–Cooyar Road to the Bunya Mountains. It is part of the shortest route from Dalby to the Bunya Mountains.

Bunya Mountains–Maclagan Road

This is a state-controlled district road (number 4163), part of which is rated LRRS. It runs from Maclagan through Moola to the Bunya Mountains Road. Together with Jondaryan–Nungil Road and Pechey–Maclagan Road it provides a fairly direct route from the Warrego Highway at Jondaryan to the Bunya Mountains.

Bell–Kaimkillenbun Road
This road connects the Bunya Highway at Bell to the Dalby–Cooyar Road at Kaimkillenbun. Part of it is part of the shortest route from Bell to the Bunya Mountains.

History

The Dalby area was settled in the 1840s, and a township was surveyed in 1853 and founded in 1854. A post office opened in 1855 and a school in 1861. The railway arrived in 1868, allowing the town to grow as the commercial centre for properties around it.

Irvingdale pastoral run was established in the 1840s. In 1849 a pastoral run named Cumkillenbar was established in the area now named Kaimkillenbun. The first roads were cut to enable access to the pastoral runs and other settlements for wheeled vehicles.

In 1889 the town that is now Maclagan was surveyed, and a butter and cheese factory was established in Quinalow. A reliable road connection from these towns to Dalby was needed to provide access to markets and larger items of equipment. The extension of the road to Cooyar was the logical completion of a "missing link".

Cooyar was first established as a pastoral run.

Major intersections
All distances are from Google Maps.

See also

 List of road routes in Queensland
 List of numbered roads in Queensland

References

Roads in Queensland